Mesodina gracillima, the northern iris-skipper, is a butterfly of the family Hesperiidae. It is endemic to the northern coast of Australia's Northern Territory.

The wingspan is about 30 mm.

The larvae feed on Patersonia macrantha. They construct a vertical shelter made by joining the leaves of its host plant with silk. It rests in this shelter during the day. Pupation takes place inside the shelter.

External links
Australian Insects
Australian Faunal Directory

Trapezitinae
Butterflies described in 1987